Michael Paseka Te'o (born July 23, 1993) is an American professional rugby player who plays for San Diego Legion of Major League Rugby (MLR). He also represents the America as a member of the United States national rugby union team.

He previously played for London Scottish in the RFU Championship England's second tier competition. 

Te'o debuted for the U.S. at the 2016 Americas Rugby Championship, playing mostly at scrum-half, but also at fullback.

Early career
As a youth, Te'o grew up in Long Beach, California. He played American football for the Long Beach Polytechnic football team in addition to rugby. 

Te'o was a member of the United States national under-20 rugby union team that won the 2012 IRB Junior World Rugby Trophy.

Professional rugby career
Te'o has also played for the United States national rugby sevens team, debuting at the 2012 Gold Coast Sevens during the 2012-13 World Rugby Sevens Series. Te'o was later named as a non-traveling reserve for the U.S. sevens squad for the 2014 Australia Sevens. Te'o played for the U.S. sevens team in the 2015 Pan American games.

Before signing with the San Diego Breakers in the short-lived PRO Rugby, Te'o played for Belmont Shore in Long Beach, California in both 15s and sevens. With Belmont Shore he won the 2012 15s National Championship, the Club 7's National Championship, and was named 7's tournament MVP. He has also played with the Taranaki Development program in New Zealand.

Te’o signed with London Scottish ahead of the 2020–21 season, but never played a match as the season was suspended due to the pandemic. The Utah Warriors signed USA Mike Te’o for the 2021 Major League Rugby season.

References

External links
 

American rugby union players
Sportspeople from Long Beach, California
1993 births
United States international rugby union players
United States international rugby sevens players
Living people
San Diego Breakers players
San Diego Legion players
London Scottish F.C. players
Pan American Games medalists in rugby sevens
Pan American Games bronze medalists for the United States
Rugby sevens players at the 2015 Pan American Games
Medalists at the 2015 Pan American Games
Rugby union fullbacks
Rugby union wings
Utah Warriors players